Shustoke was a railway station on what is now the Birmingham to Peterborough Line between Whitacre Junction (now closed) and Arley and Fillongley (also closed).

References

Former Midland Railway stations
Railway stations opened in 1864
Railway stations closed in 1968